Versapay (previously VersaPay) is a Canadian financial technology company that specializes in accounts receivable software. It was listed on the TSX Venture Exchange under the symbol VPY between January 2010 and February 2020 when it was acquired by private equity firm Great Hill Partners for $126 million.

Background
Versapay is a financial technology company, that together with its partners, provides the hardware, technology, infrastructure and support services to enable businesses of all types to accept and process electronic payments. In addition, the Company's proprietary accounts receivable cloud automation software (ARC) facilitates the efficient exchange of documents and payments between suppliers and customers.

In 2009, Canadian Business Magazine named Versapay Corporation the fastest growing company in Canada. Revenue for Versapay had grown from $50,000 in 2006 to $5.1 Million in 2008, processing an estimated $230 Million in 2008 from over 2800 clients, as of 2013 - Versapay processes in excess of $1 billion annually.

History
Versapay Corporation was founded in 2006 by Michael Gokturk and Kevin Short. Versapay began accepting clients in 2007 as it set up the company’s headquarters in Vancouver, BC. Versapay began to diversify its client-base by introducing a new proprietary payment processing solution for both B2B (business-to-business) and B2C (business-to-consumer) transactions.

Partnership with Chase Paymentech
In January 2007, Versapay partnered with the Canadian affiliate of Chase Paymentech, a United States-based payment processing company. This strategic partnership allowed Versapay to begin processing commonly used electronic payment methods such as Visa, MasterCard, American Express, Discover, JCB, Interac Direct Debit and Interac Online. Versapay began to use the Chase name when marketing Versapay to clients in order to increase the assurance and reliability of Versapay’s products. After building up enough reputation, Versapay stopped using the Chase name only one year later.

Acquisition of Positive Inc
In February 2008, Versapay acquired a 75% interest in Positive Inc., a wireless payment technology provider, to offer this option to their clients. In June 2010, Versapay agreed to sell its ownership in Positive Inc. back to the company in return for shares in Versapay.

Initial Public Offering
Versapay began trading on the TSX Venture Exchange on January 20, 2010. Versapay shares trade under the symbol "VPY".

Marketing Partnership with MasterCard International
In November 2012, Versapay signed a marketing agreement with MasterCard International. This partnership gave merchants using Versapay's proprietary platform preferential pricing in an effort to help drive new credit card usage in markets traditionally limited by low margins and that was historically cheque-driven.

Referral and Processing Agreement with Toronto Dominion Bank
In May 2013, Versapay announced a referral and processing agreement with TD Merchant Services, an operating division of TD Bank. This relationship allowed Versapay to process business-to-business electronic payment methods on Versapay's cloud-based payment processing solution. The solution is to be offered to North American Merchants sourced by TD and Versapay.

Leadership Change
In May 2010, shortly after the Company's successful IPO on the Toronto Stock Exchange, the founder and CEO Michael Gokturk was abruptly replaced by the Board of Directors. Bill McGill, the Company's CFO at the time, assumed the role of CEO. Michael Gokturk resurfaced in January 2011 to launch his new payments company Payfirma, which was the first in Canada to deploy mobile payments on smartphones. In September 2013, Versapay announced the departure of Bill McGill as CEO. Craig O'Neill, previously the co-founder and CEO of Xeye (sold to Odyssey Financial Technologies) - was appointed CEO of Versapay.

Board Change
In August 2014, Versapay announced Jason Gurandiano resigned as Chairman Of the Board of Directors. Art Mesher, previously CEO and Chairman of the board of The Descartes Systems Group was appointed new Chairman of the board of Versapay.

Sale of Merchant Services Division
January 2017, Versapay received shareholder approval for the sale of its Merchant Services division for proceeds up to $11,000,000. As part of this transition, BluePay (the purchaser) has acquired the Montreal office and its staff (except for Patrick MacDonald who has been in the President position with the company since 2007) and all related agents, associations and processing partner relationships related to the merchant services business. The transaction was successfully completed on February 1, 2017.

Fintech
After completing the sale of its merchant services division in 2017, Versapay became focused on offering its Accounts Receivable SaaS solution - Versapay ARC, and started onboarding enterprise accounts on its platform throughout North America. Versapay announced in July 2017 that Royal Bank of Canada had partnered with Versapay to white-label the ARC solution and offer it to their customer base.

Later in May 2018, Versapay announced a partnership with First Data to become a Payment Facilitator, starting in Canada and the USA, as part of its global merchant acquiring strategy to support worldwide payment acceptance for its customer base.

Take Private Transaction
In December 2019, Great Hill Partners a Boston-based growth-oriented private equity firm, tendered an all-cash offer to acquire Versapay for an estimated $129 million dollars in a take private transaction.

Partnership with Great Hill Partners 
In February 2020, Versapay Corporation partnered with Great Hill Partners (Great Hill), a Boston-based leading private equity firm focused on development. This relationship reflects a continued dedication to promoting the growth of SaaS-enabled businesses, and will include the tools required by the Versapay team to pursue their global expansion.

Leadership Team 
In July 2020, Versapay reported the appointment to its Executive Leadership Team of three new members. Keith Reed became a Chief Sales Officer, Bob Stark succeeds as Chief Marketing Officer (CMO) and Philip Pettinato becomes Chief Technical Officer (CTO), giving the Organization a cumulative 75 + years of financial technology leadership expertise. The growth of the leadership team follows the confirmation of the purchase of Versapay by Great Hill Partners, which was completed in February 2020.

References

Companies formerly listed on the TSX Venture Exchange
Financial services companies established in 2006
Financial services companies of Canada
Companies based in Toronto
Payment service providers
Payments
Software companies of Canada